This is a list of museums in Belize.

Museums in Belize 

Ambergris Museum
Belmopan Museum
Bliss Institute
Image Factory Art Foundation and Gallery
Maritime Museum (Belize)
Museum of Belize
Old Belize Museum and Cucumber Beach

See also 

 List of museums

External links 	

Museums
 
Museums
Belize
Museums
Belize